This article a list of the winners of the Bengal Film Journalists' Association - Best Director Award winners.

See also

 Bengal Film Journalists' Association Awards
 Cinema of India

References

External links
 https://web.archive.org/web/20080229010408/http://www.bfjaawards.com/

Best Director